Calophyllum papuanum is a species of flowering plant in the Calophyllaceae family. It is found in Indonesia and Papua New Guinea.

References

papuanum
Trees of the Maluku Islands
Trees of New Guinea
Least concern plants
Taxonomy articles created by Polbot